Richard Wright may refer to:

Arts
 Richard Wright (author) (1908–1960), African-American novelist
 Richard B. Wright (1937–2017), Canadian novelist
 Richard Wright (painter) (1735–1775), marine painter
 Richard Wright (artist) (born 1960), British artist and musician, band member of Correcto
 Richard Wright (musician) (1943–2008), founding member of Pink Floyd

Politics
 Richard Wright (MP) (1568–1639), MP for Dorchester from 1597 to 1598
 Richard L. Wright (born 1943), American political leader
 Richard R. Wright (1855–1947), American military officer, educator, politician, civil rights advocate, and banking entrepreneur

Sports
 Richard Wright (cricketer, born 1877) (1877–1942), English cricketer
 Richard Wright (cricketer, born 1903) (1903–1991), English cricketer
 Richard Wright (footballer) (born 1977), retired English football goalkeeper

Other
 Richard Wright (headmaster) (1572–1638), headmaster of Eaton College 1611
 Richard Wright (Unitarian) (1764–1836), Unitarian minister
 Richard Cotsman Wright (1841–1921), Canadian architect
 Richard R. Wright Jr. (1878–1967), American sociologist
 Richard T. Wright (born 1951), American criminologist
 Orville Wilbur Richard "Rick" Wright, a character in the TV series Magnum, P.I., named Orville "Rick" Wright in the 2018 series reboot

See also 
 Dick Wright (disambiguation)
 Ricky Wright (disambiguation)